John White (27 August 1897 – 11 February 1986) was a Scottish footballer who played as a forward. He played for Albion Rovers and Heart of Midlothian (two spells) in his native country, and Leeds United in England. While at Hearts, in 1926 he achieved the highly unusual feat of scoring four goals in three successive matches.

He also gained two caps for the Scotland national team, and is the only Albion Rovers player ever to be capped while on the club's books.

Personal life
Born in Coatbridge, Jock White was one of four brothers who played top-class football — Willie was a goalkeeper with Hamilton Academical, Hearts and Southampton, Tom a winger who played with Hearts and Alloa Athletic, and Jimmy aka 'Tec' a forward with Albion Rovers (playing alongside Jock in the 1920 Scottish Cup Final which Albion lost to Kilmarnock), Motherwell and in the United States. All four brothers played together for Hearts in the Lord Provost's Rent Relief Cup final of 1923 which their side won through two goals from Jock.

He was also the brother-in-law of Andrew Anderson, a team-mate at Hearts for four seasons.

See also
List of Scotland international footballers (2–3 caps)
List of Scottish football families

References

1897 births
1986 deaths
Albion Rovers F.C. players
Association football inside forwards
Heart of Midlothian F.C. players
Leeds United F.C. players
Margate F.C. players
Footballers from Coatbridge
Scotland international footballers
Scottish Football League players
Scottish Football League representative players
Scottish footballers
English Football League players
Date of death missing
Scottish league football top scorers